Muhammad Shahidullah is a Communist Party of Bangladesh politician and the former Member of Parliament of Thakurgaon-3.

Career
Shahidullah was elected to parliament from Thakurgaon-3 as a Communist Party of Bangladesh candidate in 1986.

References

Communist Party of Bangladesh politicians
Living people
3rd Jatiya Sangsad members
Year of birth missing (living people)